The 1946 Greenville propane explosion occurred on 19 November 1946, at the Ideal Laundry laundromat in Greenville, South Carolina. The blast, which killed 6 people and injured over 150, was felt as far away as Gaffney, 50 miles to the northeast.

Explosion
Ideal Laundry and Cleaners was a large industrial laundromat, located on the northeastern side of Greenville. Initially, the laundry's boilers were powered by burning coal. Greenville city officials had pressured the company to reduce its smoke pollution for several years prior to World War II, leading the plant's manager, E.R. Haynie, to investigate propane as an alternative fuel in the summer of 1946. Haynie toured several industrial plants where Superior Gas Corporation had installed large propane systems, and was satisfied with their efficiency. Superior Gas installed a  propane tank at Haynie's personal residence several months before installing a  system at Ideal Laundry in November, 1946.

In the afternoon of November 19, several days after the switch from coal to propane, the tank had been filled to approximately half of its capacity when a leak in the system was noticed. Haynie ordered the building to be evacuated and ran to the fire department a block away; superintendent J. Carl Trammel remained inside, and directed the evacuation of Ideal Laundry employees. At approximately 6 PM, mere minutes after the leak was first noticed, the propane leaking into the basement of Ideal Laundry had reached the critical air–fuel ratio between 2.4 to 9.5 percent, and was ignited by the boilers.

The explosion demolished all but one corner of the Ideal Laundry building, and according to a Red Cross survey the following day, destroyed nearly 20 structures nearby; most were houses belonging to African-Americans. The Third Presbyterian Church across the street was one of approximately 50 other buildings that were severely damaged. Over 150 people were injured, and several dozen were admitted to local hospitals, but there were only six fatalities. Superintendent Trammel and three Ideal Laundry employees, all of them Black women, were killed before completing their evacuation. One firefighter on the scene was also killed in the explosion, as was a visitor who assisted in the evacuation. Five minutes after the explosion, the remaining propane in the tank fueled a fire that reached nearly 600 feet into the air. The fire and explosion were witnessed for over 50 miles, including in Caesar's Head, Easley, Gaffney, Greer, and Liberty.

Aftermath
In addition to firefighters from all across Greenville County, soldiers from Greenville Army Air Base arrived to prevent looting. Injured citizens, some of whom had been buried in rubble or thrown from their houses, were assisted to hospitals. Severe traffic jams formed into the night as curious civilians attempted to drive into Greenville.

Two federal officials from the United States Bureau of Mines in Pittsburgh assisted Greenville police and Ideal Laundry officials in investigating the cause of the explosion. It was determined that the propane system was improperly constructed and installed, resulting in the gas leak. The report also urged that such large propane tanks should be kept further away from populated areas, that automatic or remote shut-off valves should be included in such systems, and that newly installed systems should be inspected by an impartial qualified agency before their first use.

The Superior Gas Corporation engineer who oversaw the installation of the system at Ideal Laundry committed suicide shortly after the release of the report, and the company declared bankruptcy shortly thereafter.

Several homeowners whose houses had been destroyed by the blast filed a lawsuit against Ideal Laundry, seeking compensation for the destruction of their houses. In 1949, Ideal Laundry was held not responsible; the bankrupt Superior Gas Corporation was held to be the only responsible party, having been legally contracted to install the propane system, and still overseeing it at the time of the explosion.

See also
 Cleveland East Ohio Gas explosion
 Third Presbyterian Church (Greenville, South Carolina)

References

Explosions in 1946
Gas explosions
Greenville, South Carolina
Disasters in South Carolina
1946 fires in the United States
Explosions in the United States
Building collapses in the United States
1946 in South Carolina
Industrial fires and explosions in the United States
November 1946 events in the United States
1946 disasters in the United States
Building collapses caused by fire